Levi Twiggs (21 May 1793 – 13 September 1847) was an officer in the United States Marine Corps during the War of 1812, the Seminole Wars, and the Mexican–American War.

Biography

Born in Richmond County, Georgia, Twiggs was commissioned a second lieutenant on 10 November 1813. During the War of 1812, he saw action on board President and was captured when that frigate was taken by a squadron of four British warships. After being imprisoned at Bermuda, he was freed when word of the Treaty of Ghent reached that island. Over two decades later, he took part in the Seminole Wars in Florida and Georgia in 1836 and 1837, and achieved the rank of major in November 1840. When the war with Mexico opened, Major Twiggs requested an active part in the fighting and was attached to the Marine Battalion which left New York in June 1847. He fell to enemy fire as he led a storming party in the assault on Chapultepec before Mexico City on 13 September 1847 and was interred at Laurel Hill Cemetery in Philadelphia.

Namesake
Two ships, USS Twiggs, were named for him.

See also

References

1793 births
1847 deaths
United States Marine Corps officers
War of 1812 prisoners of war held by the United Kingdom
People from Richmond County, Georgia
Deaths by firearm in Mexico
American military personnel of the War of 1812
American military personnel of the Mexican–American War
American military personnel killed in the Mexican–American War
Burials at Laurel Hill Cemetery (Philadelphia)